The 2000–01 NBA season was the 13th season for the Miami Heat in the National Basketball Association. During the off-season, the Heat acquired All-Star guard Eddie Jones, Anthony Mason and Ricky Davis from the Charlotte Hornets, acquired Brian Grant from the Portland Trail Blazers in a three-team trade, and signed free agent A.C. Green. However, before the start of the season, All-Star center Alonzo Mourning suffered a kidney disorder and only played in the final thirteen games of the season. Without Mourning, the Heat struggled with a 5–9 start as Davis only played just seven games due to ankle and knee injuries, and was out for the rest of the season. However, they soon recovered playing above .500 as the season progressed, as the team acquired Cedric Ceballos in a trade with the Detroit Pistons in late November. The Heat held a 30–20 record at the All-Star break, and finished second in the Atlantic Division with a solid 50–32 record.

Jones led the team with 17.4 points and 1.7 steals per game, while Mason averaged 16.1 points and 9.6 rebounds per game, Grant provided the team with 15.2 points and 8.8 rebounds per game, and Tim Hardaway contributed 14.9 points and 6.3 assists per game. In addition, Mourning averaged 13.6 points, 7.8 rebounds and 2.4 blocks per game, mostly playing off the bench as backup center during his short 13-game stint. Mason and Mourning were both selected for the 2001 NBA All-Star Game, although Mourning did not play due to his kidney disorder. However, in the Eastern Conference First Round of the playoffs, the Heat were swept by the 6th-seeded Charlotte Hornets in three straight games.

The Heat made several transactions following the season; Mason signed as a free agent with the Milwaukee Bucks, while Hardaway was traded to the Dallas Mavericks, Ceballos signed with the Denver Nuggets, but was later on waived and then retired, Bruce Bowen signed with the San Antonio Spurs, Davis was dealt to the Cleveland Cavaliers, three-point specialist Dan Majerle re-signed with his former team, the Phoenix Suns, and Green and Duane Causwell both retired.

Offseason

Draft picks

Roster

Regular season

Season standings

z - clinched division title
y - clinched division title
x - clinched playoff spot

Record vs. opponents

Playoffs

|- align="center" bgcolor="#ffcccc"
| 1
| April 21
| Charlotte
| L 80–106
| Eddie House (16)
| Brian Grant (10)
| Tim Hardaway (5)
| American Airlines Arena20,085
| 0–1
|- align="center" bgcolor="#ffcccc"
| 2
| April 23
| Charlotte
| L 76–102
| Eddie Jones (21)
| Grant, Jones (6)
| Tim Hardaway (4)
| American Airlines Arena16,500
| 0–2
|- align="center" bgcolor="#ffcccc"
| 3
| April 27
| @ Charlotte
| L 79–94
| Eddie Jones (22)
| Alonzo Mourning (9)
| Anthony Carter (5)
| Charlotte Coliseum22,283
| 0–3
|-

Player statistics

Season

Playoffs

Awards and records

Transactions

References

Miami Heat seasons
Miami Heat
Miami Heat
Miami Heat